Pseudotetracha scapularis is a species of tiger beetle in the subfamily Cicindelinae. It was described by William John Macleay in 1863, and is endemic to Australia.

References

Beetles described in 1863
Endemic fauna of Australia
Beetles of Australia